Dorothy Ann Richards (née Willis; September 1, 1933 – September 13, 2006) was an American politician who served as the 45th governor of Texas from 1991 to 1995. A Democrat, she first came to national attention as the Texas State Treasurer, when she gave the keynote address at the 1988 Democratic National Convention. Richards was the second female governor of Texas (the first being Miriam A. Ferguson), and was frequently noted in the media for her outspoken feminism and her one-liners.

Born in McLennan County, Texas, Richards became a schoolteacher after graduating from Baylor University. She won election to the Travis County Commissioners' Court in 1976, and took office as Texas State Treasurer in 1983. She delivered a nominating speech for Walter Mondale at the 1984 Democratic National Convention, and the keynote address at the 1988 Democratic National Convention.

Richards won the 1990 Texas gubernatorial election, defeating Texas Attorney General Jim Mattox in a Democratic primary run-off election and businessman Clayton Williams in the general election. She was defeated in the 1994 Texas gubernatorial election by George W. Bush. She remained active in public life until her death in 2006.

, Richards remains the most recent Democrat, and woman, to serve as Governor of Texas.

Early life
Richards was born in Lakeview (now part of Lacy Lakeview), in McLennan County, Texas, the only child of Robert Cecil Willis and Mildred Iona Warren. She grew up in Waco, participated in Girls State, and graduated from Waco High School in 1950. She attended Baylor University on a debate team scholarship, and earned a bachelor's degree. After marrying high school sweetheart David "Dave" Richards, she moved to Austin, where she earned a teaching certificate from the University of Texas. David and Ann Richards had four children: Cecile, Daniel, Clarke, and Ellen. Her first cousin once removed was the art historian Gary Tinterow.

Richards taught social studies and history at Fulmore Junior High School (re-named Lively Middle School) in Austin from 1955 to 1956. She campaigned for Texas liberals and progressives, such as Henry B. Gonzalez, Ralph Yarborough, and future U.S. District Judge Sarah T. Hughes.

Political career

Early political career
By the 1970s, Richards was an accomplished political worker, having worked to elect Democrats Sarah Weddington and Wilhelmina Delco to the Texas Legislature, and having presented training sessions throughout the state on campaign techniques for women candidates and managers. She supported ratification of the Equal Rights Amendment to the U.S. Constitution, presenting the amendment to the delegates of the National Women's Conference, held in Houston in 1978, but the amendment was never ratified by enough states to become part of the Constitution.

In 1976, Richards ran against and defeated a three-term incumbent on the four-member Travis County Commissioners' Court; she took 81.4 percent of the vote against Libertarian opponent Laurel Freeman to win re-election in 1980. During this time, her marriage ended. Richards' drinking became more pronounced, and she sought and completed treatment for alcoholism in 1980.

State Treasurer
After incumbent Texas State Treasurer Warren G. Harding (no relation to the U.S. president) became mired in legal troubles in 1982, Richards won the Democratic nomination for that post. Winning election against a Republican opponent in November that year, Richards became the first woman elected to statewide office in more than fifty years. In 1986, she was re-elected treasurer without opposition. Richards was a popular and proactive treasurer who worked to maximize the return of Texas state investments. Richards said that when she took office, the Treasury Department was run something like a 1930s country bank, with deposits that didn't earn interest. At the 1984 Democratic National Convention, Richards delivered one of the nominating speeches for nominee Walter Mondale, and she campaigned actively for the Mondale/Ferraro ticket in Texas, even though President Ronald Reagan enjoyed great popularity in her state.

1988 Democratic National Convention
Richards' keynote address to the 1988 Democratic National Convention put her in the national spotlight. The speech was highly critical of the Reagan Administration and then-Vice President George H. W. Bush. Her address was notable for including several humorous remarks displaying her down-home Texas charm such as: "I'm delighted to be here with you this evening, because after listening to George Bush all these years, I figured you needed to know what a real Texas accent sounds like", "Poor George, he can't help it. He was born with a silver foot in his mouth", "Two women in 160 years is about par for the course. But if you give us a chance, we can perform. After all, Ginger Rogers did everything that Fred Astaire did. She just did it backwards and in high heels", and "When we pay billions for planes that won't fly, billions for tanks that won't fire, and billions for systems that won't work, that old dog won't hunt. And you don't have to be from Waco to know that when the Pentagon makes crooks rich and doesn't make America strong, that it's a bum deal". Richards' convention address has been cited by rhetorical experts as a historically significant speech.
The speech set the tone for her political future. In 1989, with co-author Peter Knobler, she wrote her autobiography, Straight from the Heart: My Life in Politics and Other Places.

Governor (1991–1995)

In 1990, Texas' Republican governor, Bill Clements, decided not to run for re-election to a third nonconsecutive term. Richards painted herself as a sensible progressive, and won the Democratic gubernatorial nomination against Attorney General (and former U.S. representative) Jim Mattox of Dallas and former Governor Mark White of Houston. Mattox ran a particularly abrasive campaign against Richards, accusing her of having had drug problems beyond alcoholism. The Republicans nominated colorful and eccentric multi-millionaire rancher Clayton Williams, of Fort Stockton and Midland. Republican political activist Susan Weddington of San Antonio, a Williams supporter, placed a black wreath that read "Death to the Family" at the door of Richards's campaign headquarters in Austin. After a series of legendary gaffes by Williams (most notably a joke about the crime of rape), Richards narrowly won on November 6, 1990, with 49% of the vote to Williams' 47%. Libertarian Party candidate Jeff Daiell drew 3.3 percent in an effort that included television spots and considerable personal campaigning. Richards was inaugurated governor the following January.

Richards became the second woman to hold Texas's top office, since Miriam "Ma" Ferguson, who is widely considered to have been a proxy for impeached governor James E. "Pa" Ferguson, her husband.

The economy of Texas had been in a slump since the mid-1980s, compounded by a downturn in the U.S. economy. Richards responded with a program of economic revitalization, yielding growth in 1991 of 2 percent when the U.S. economy as a whole shrank. Richards also attempted to streamline Texas's government and regulatory institutions for business and the public; her efforts in the former tried but failed to help revitalize Texas's corporate infrastructure for its explosive economic growth later in the decade, and her audits on the state bureaucracy saved $600 million.

As governor, Richards reformed the Texas prison system, establishing a substance abuse program for inmates, reducing the number of violent offenders released, and increasing prison space to deal with a growing prison population (from less than 60,000 in 1992 to more than 80,000 in 1994). She backed proposals to reduce the sale of semi-automatic firearms and "cop-killer" bullets in the state.

She signed into law the amendment of the Texas Financial Responsibility Law where renewal of a motor vehicle's registration (also covers initial registration of a motor vehicle), safety inspection sticker, driver's license, and/or obtaining new license plates require that a motorist must have a valid auto insurance policy. The law, which passed on September 1, 1991, broadens the 1982 law where a police officer will request a driver's license and proof of insurance during a traffic stop.

She appointed then State Representative Lena Guerrero of Austin to a vacancy on the Texas Railroad Commission. The Hispanic Guerrero (1957–2008) was the first non-Anglo to serve on the commission in history. However, problems over falsification of her resume led to her resignation from the commission and defeat by the Republican Barry Williamson in the 1992 general election.

The Texas Lottery was also instituted during her governorship—advocated as a means of supplementing school finances; Richards purchased the first lottery ticket on May 29, 1992, in Oak Hill, near Austin.

School finance remained one of the key issues of Richards' governorship and of those succeeding hers; the famous Robin Hood plan was launched in the 1992–1993 biennium and attempted to make school funding more equitable across school districts. Richards also sought to decentralize control over education policy to districts and individual campuses; she instituted "site-based management" to this end.

In 1993, Richards signed into law the re-codified Texas Penal Code which included anti-homosexual Section 21.06, the state's "Homosexual Conduct" law which states: "(a) A person commits an offense if he engages in deviate sexual intercourse with another individual of the same sex.
(b) An offense under this section is a Class C misdemeanor.". In 1990, Richards had campaigned in Houston to repeal the law. But, as governor, her signature criminalized same-sex sexual relations in Texas.

In 1994, Richards ran for re-election against Republican George W. Bush. Despite outspending his campaign by 23%, she was defeated, with 45.88% of the vote to Bush's 53.48% while Libertarian Keary Ehlers received 0.64%. The Richards campaign had hoped for a misstep from the relatively inexperienced Republican candidate, but none appeared, while Richards created many of her own, including calling Bush "some jerk", "shrub" and "that young Bush boy".

Post-governorship
Richards was defeated in the 1994 Republican landslide that also unseated New York Governor Mario Cuomo and brought a Republican majority to the United States Senate and the United States House of Representatives. Richards and Cuomo appeared in a series of humorous television commercials for the snack food Doritos shortly afterward, in which they discussed the "sweeping changes" occurring. The changes they are discussing turn out to be the new Doritos packaging.

Beginning in 2001, Richards was a senior advisor to the communications firm Public Strategies, Inc. in Austin and New York. From 1995 to 2001, Richards was also a senior advisor with Verner, Liipfert, Bernhard, McPherson and Hand, a Washington, D.C.-based international law firm. Richards sat on the boards of the Aspen Institute, JCPenney, and T.I.G. Holdings.

One of her daughters, Cecile Richards, became president of Planned Parenthood in 2006. Ann Richards demonstrated interest in social causes such as equality, abortion, and women's rights.

She was a tireless campaigner for Democratic candidates throughout the United States. In the 2004 presidential election, Richards endorsed Howard Dean for the Democratic nomination, and campaigned on his behalf. Richards later stumped for Democratic nominee John Kerry, highlighting the issues of health care and women's rights. Some political pundits mentioned her as a potential running mate to Kerry; however, she did not make his list of top finalists, and he selected North Carolina Senator John Edwards. Richards said that she was "not interested" in a political comeback.

Teaching
Richards taught social studies and history at Fulmore Junior High School (now Lively Middle School) in Austin (1954–1957). She continued teaching in later years.

She served at Brandeis University as the Fred and Rita Richman Distinguished Visiting Professor of Politics from 1997 to 1998. In 1998 she was elected as a trustee of Brandeis University in Waltham, Massachusetts, she was reelected in 2004, and continued to hold the position until her death.

Richards was diagnosed with osteoporosis in 1996, having lost  inch in height and broken her hand and ankle. She changed her diet and lifestyle, and then her bone density stabilized. She spoke frequently about this experience, teaching or advocating a healthier lifestyle for women at risk of the disease. In 2004, she authored I'm Not Slowing Down, with the gynaecologist Richard U. Levine, which describes her own battle with osteoporosis and offers guidance to others with the disease.

In Steve Labinski's review, he described the book as inspiring women to fight the disease with various tactics, such as:

 identifying factors that might increase vulnerability to osteoporosis including lack of estrogen, menopause, and usage of drugs related to caffeine, tobacco and alcohol;
 emphasizing the impact of bone-density tests and explaining the process using Ann Richard's own bone test as an example;
 supplying an extensive list of calcium-enriched foods which are beneficial, plus noting some foods to avoid;
 listing everyday tips to improve muscle condition and prevent bone injuries.

In the fall of 2005, Richards taught a class called "Women and Leadership" at the University of Texas at Austin; 21 female students were selected for that class.

Arts and film

One of her first legislative requests was to move the Texas Music Office (created in 1990 during the administration of Governor Bill Clements) and the Texas Film Commission (created in 1971 during Governor Preston Smith's term) from the Texas Department of Commerce to the Office of the Governor.

Her longtime personal interest in Texas film and music greatly raised the public profile of both industries and brought the two programs into the Governor's Office. As a result, these industries were institutionalized as key high-profile parts of Texas' future economic growth plans. Other of her music milestones include publishing the first "Texas Music Industry Directory" (1991) and her "Welcome to Texas" speech to the opening day registrants of the 1993 South By Southwest Music and Media Conference. She was involved with the Texas Film Hall of Fame from the beginning. At the first ceremony, she inducted Liz Smith. She was emcee every subsequent year but had to cancel at the last minute in 2006 because of her diagnosis with cancer.

Richards said, "I've been a friend to Texas film since the number of people who cared about Texas film could have fit in a phone booth." She was an advocate for the Texas film industry and traveled to Los Angeles to market her state. Gary Bond, the director of the Austin Film Commission, noted, "She was far from being the first governor to appoint a film commissioner; I think she was the first that really brought the focus of Hollywood to Texas."

She was also a mentor to other women. She advised Rebecca Campbell, executive director of the Austin Film Society, "Whenever you speak in public you've got to tell them what you need from them." She put the spotlight on film as a genuine industry, brought more focus to Texas, and had a tremendous network of people in the entertainment industry. She gave more focus to film as a business than had been done before.

She was interviewed in the 1996 Ken Burns documentary series The West about the history of Texas and the United States in the 1800s. In the film she claims that the colonization of the United States required genocide and dispossession, "But even knowing all of that. And wishing that part of it were not there, cannot take away the spirit and idealism and the excitement that people (settlers) felt that actually did it and that we still feel when we think about them doing it." Richards also appeared in a 2009 documentary film, Sam Houston: American Statesman, Soldier, and Pioneer.

It is believed that her last appearance in film was in a short public announcement used at the Alamo Drafthouse, asking patrons not to be disruptive during the film. The Alamo Drafthouse still uses it today, with an addition at the end in honor of Ann Richards.

Richards was active in the Austin City Limits Festivals, and the SXSW festival: the interactive, music, and film festival, held each year in Austin.

Awards and recognition
During her career, Ann Richards received many awards and honors including: Baylor Distinguished Alumna, the Texas NAACP Presidential Award for Outstanding Contributions to Civil Rights, the National Wildlife Federation Conservation Achievement Award, the Orden del Aguila Azteca (Order of the Aztec Eagle) presented by the government of Mexico, the Maurice N. Eisendrath Bearer of Light Award from the Union of American Hebrew Congregations, and the Texas Women's Hall of Fame honoree for Public Service.

Final years and death
While the events of 9/11 motivated many New Yorkers to leave the city, Liz Smith wrote that it drove the former governor to that city in which she would spend the last five years of her life. She said that she wanted to convey a message that "just because something tragic and life altering may happen, that doesn't mean we're supposed to turn heel and run away."

In March 2006, Richards disclosed that she had been diagnosed with esophageal cancer and received treatment at the University of Texas MD Anderson Cancer Center in Houston. Alcohol and tobacco exposure are major risk factors for certain types of esophageal cancer; by her own admission, Richards said that she "smoked like a chimney and drank like a fish" in her younger years.

Richards died of cancer at her home in Austin on September 13, 2006, at the age of 73. Three memorial services were held. Her remains are interred at Texas State Cemetery in Austin.

Legacy

The City of Austin changed the official name of Congress Avenue Bridge (which opened in 1910) to Ann W. Richards Congress Avenue Bridge on November 16, 2006.

Her 1988 DNC keynote address was listed as #38 in American Rhetoric's Top 100 Speeches of the 20th Century (listed by rank).

The Ann Richards School for Young Women Leaders in Austin, Texas, which Ann Richards helped to create, is named for her. The Ann Richards School, a college preparatory school for girls in grades 6–12, opened in the fall of 2007 in Austin, and continues to celebrate the life and legacy of Governor Richards. She also inaugurated a school in the year 1999 named Ann Richards Middle School in Palmview, Texas.

A tribute to Richards was featured during the "HerStory" video tribute to notable women on U2's tour in 2017 for the 30th anniversary of The Joshua Tree during a performance of "Ultraviolet (Light My Way)" from the band's 1991 album Achtung Baby.

In popular culture
In 2001, Richards guest starred as herself in a fifth-season episode of the Texas-based animated TV series King of the Hill. In the episode entitled "Hank and the Great Glass Elevator", she gets mooned by Hank Hill and then enters into a brief relationship with Bill Dauterive. She is also seen in the closing credits of King of the Hill Season 1 Episode 4, playing tether ball with Willie Nelson's roadie.

Richards made a voice cameo in Disney's 2004 animated film Home on the Range, where she voiced a saloon owner named Annie.

Richards was a topic in the film Bush's Brain (by Joseph Mealey and Michael Shoob), in a long segment regarding her defeat in the 1994 election for Texas governor. The film presents the case that the defeat of Richards involved a whisper campaign that the governor (mother of four children) was a lesbian because she had allegedly hired many gays and lesbians to work on her re-election campaign.

In the 2008 Oliver Stone film W., Richards is mentioned during George Bush's campaign as "Ms. Big Mouth, Big Hair".

Richards was one of the characters portrayed by Anna Deavere Smith in her play, Let Me Down Easy, which explores illness, death, and the healthcare system. The show opened in 2008, played in cities around the country, and was featured as part of PBS's Great Performances series on January 13, 2012.

In 2010, actress Holland Taylor debuted in a one-woman show called "Ann: An Affectionate Portrait of Ann Richards" at the Charline McCombs Empire Theater in San Antonio, Texas. The show was subsequently staged at the Kennedy Center in Washington, D.C., and the Vivian Beaumont Theater in New York City's Lincoln Center in 2013. PBS Great Performances broadcast the premiere of the play, now titled simply "Ann," on June 19, 2020. It had been recorded at the Zach Theater in Austin, Texas, following its national tour and Broadway run. Taylor said of her subject, "She was brave, strong, and funny—Bill Clinton has said the wittiest person he'd ever met!...She ran as a liberal in conservative Texas, so I had to write a play about her four incredible years in Austin.... She was ahead of Obama by about 10 years as an 'inclusive' leader."

In 2012 a documentary about her political life, Ann Richards' Texas, was released. On April 28, 2014, HBO released a documentary, All About Ann: Governor Richards of the Lone Star State.

In 2019, "Call Me Ann: A Rock Opera" debuted in Houston, Texas, at the Houston Fringe Festival.

Videos
Richards's inauguration from January 15, 1991
Inaugural Parade Part I
Inaugural Parade Part II

Electoral history

Notes

References

 Ann Richards, Richard U. Levine, I'm Not Slowing Down; Winning My Battle With Osteoporosis, publisher: Plume, July 27, 2004, paperback, 208 pages, .
 Ann Richards, Richard U. Levine, I'm Not Slowing Down; Winning My Battle With Osteoporosis, publisher: E.P. Dutton, August 7, 2003, Hardcover, 256 pages, .
 Ann Richards, Peter Knobler, Straight from the Heart: My Life in Politics and Other Places, publisher: Simon & Schuster, New York, 1989, Hardcover, 256 pages, illustrated with 14 black & white photographs, .

External links

 Texas State Library: Governors of Texas
 Ann Richards' 1988 Democratic Convention Keynote Address
 

|-

|-

|-

|-

1933 births
2006 deaths
20th-century American politicians
20th-century American women politicians
American feminists
Methodists from Texas
Baylor University alumni
Burials at Texas State Cemetery
County commissioners in Texas
Deaths from cancer in Texas
Deaths from esophageal cancer
Democratic Party governors of Texas
People from Austin, Texas
People from Waco, Texas
State treasurers of Texas
University of Texas at Austin alumni
Women in Texas politics
Women state governors of the United States
Waco High School alumni